Kahurabad-e Sohrabi (also Romanized as Kahūrābād-e Sohrābī) is a village in Howmeh Rural District, in the Central District of Kahnuj County, Kerman Province, Iran. At the 2006 census, its population was 544, in 92 families.

References 

Populated places in Kahnuj County